Each team's roster consisted of at least 15 skaters (forwards and defencemen) and two goaltenders, and at most 22 skaters and three goaltenders. All 16 participating nations, through the confirmation of their respective national associations, had to submit a roster by the first IIHF directorate meeting.

Age and team as of 6 May 2016.

Group A

Czech Republic
A 25-man roster was announced on 16 April 2016. It was renewed to 27 players on 24 April 2016 and 3 May 2016.

Head coach: Vladimír Vůjtek

Denmark
A 23-man roster was announced on 11 April 2016. A 25-player roster was unveiled on 25 April 2016. The final was roster was revealed on 1 May 2016.

Head coach: Janne Karlsson

Kazakhstan
A 54-man roster was announced on 24 March 2016.

Head coach: Andrei Nazarov

Latvia
A 22-man roster was announced on 13 April 2016. The final roster was revealed on 4 May 2016.

Head coach: Leonīds Beresņevs

Norway
A 26-man roster was announced on 11 April 2016. It was made of 28 players on 28 April 2016. The final roster was announced 1 May 2016.

Head coach: Roy Johansen

Russia
A 26-man roster was announced on 7 April 2016. It was reduced to 23 on 30 April 2016. The final roster was announced on 4 May 2016.

Head coach: Oleg Znarok

Sweden
A 24-man roster was announced on 22 April 2016. The final roster was announced on 2 May 2016.

Head coach: Pär Mårts

Switzerland
A 30-man roster was announced on 16 April 2016. It was reduced to 28 on 25 April 2016. The final roster was announced on 1 May 2016.

Head coach: Patrick Fischer

Group B

Belarus
A 29-man roster was announced on 13 April 2016.

Head coach: Dave Lewis

Canada
An 18-man roster was announced on 11 April 2016. Derick Brassard, Mathew Dumba and Corey Perry were added on 28 April 2016. The final roster was announced on 4 May 2016.

Head coach: Bill Peters

Finland
A 28-man roster was announced on 18 April 2016. It was 29 players on 25 April 2016. Aleksander Barkov, Jussi Jokinen, Mikael Granlund, Mikko Koivu, Ville Pokka joined on 26 and 28 April 2016. The final roster was announced on 1 May 2016.

Head coach: Kari Jalonen

France
A 26-man roster was announced on 22 April 2016. It was reduced to 25 on 29 April 2016. The final roster was revealed on 3 May 2016.

Head coach: Dave Henderson

Germany
A 28-man roster was announced on 18 April 2016. It was 31 players on 26 April 2016, with Christian Ehrhoff joining later. Korbinian Holzer joined on 1 May 2016.

Head coach: Marco Sturm

Hungary
A 31-man roster was announced on 20 April 2016.

Head coach: Rich Chernomaz

Slovakia
A 25-man roster was announced on 18 April 2016. It was renewed on 30 April 2016.

Head coach: Zdeno Cíger

United States
A 12-man roster was announced on 12 April 2016. It was built up to 20 on 25 April 2016. The final roster was announced on 3 May 2016.

Head coach: John Hynes

References

Rosters
IIHF World Championship rosters